Le Brio is a 2017 French comedy film directed by Yvan Attal.

Plot
Neïla lives in the Paris suburb Créteil with her mother and grandmother. She enrolls herself into Panthéon-Assas University in the hopes of becoming a lawyer, but meets with public humiliation tainted with racism from the controversial professor Mazard when she arrives late for one of his lectures. The incident finds its way online, and the dean of the law school catches wind of the incident and steps in, only to task the professor, as a means to make amends, to mentor Neïla for an upcoming debating/public speaking contest. Although Neïla finds Mazard cynical and exacting, she learns from him, and both of them have to overcome their prejudices during the course of working together.

Cast
 Daniel Auteuil as Pierre Mazard, professor of law
 Camélia Jordana as Neïla Salah, law student
 Yasin Houicha as Mounir, Neïla's boyfriend, and driver
 Nozha Khouadra as Neïla's mother
 Nicolas Vaude as the Président de Paris II-Panthéon Assas
 Jean-Baptiste Lafarge as Benjamin, a law student
 Claude Perron as the woman walking her dog
 Virgil Leclaire as Keufran, a friend of Neïla 
 Zohra Benali as the grandmother of Neïla
 Damien Zanoly as Jean Proutot, a law student
 Jean-Philippe Puymartin as the chair of the competition
 Paulette Joly as Madame Mazard

Background 
The film was shot in Paris, at Panthéon-Assas university and Université Paris Nanterre, and the Sorbonne and the bibliothèque Sainte-Geneviève, in the 5th arrondissement. The scenes in the Paris métro where Neïla has to talk to indifferent passengers were filmed on Line 3bis

Camélia Jordana received the meilleur espoir féminin in 2018; the film itself and Daniel Auteuil were also both nominated for Césars.

References

External links
 

2017 films
2010s French-language films
2017 comedy films
Films directed by Yvan Attal
French comedy films
Pathé films
2010s French films